The Lavrion Square–Strofyli railway (Greek: Σιδηροδρομική Γραμμή Πλατείας Λαυρίου - Στροφυλίου Sidirodromiki Grammi Plateias Lavriou - Strofyliou) was a Greek  (metre gauge) railway line that ran from Lavrion Square in downtown Athens to the suburb of Kifissia and further on to Strofyli.

History of the line

Attica Railways (1885–1926)
The line opened on February 4, 1885, as single track, metre gauge . Until 1925 the line was operated by Attica Railways, which also operated the branch from Heraklion to Lavrion. The headquarters of Attica Railways along with a rolling stock depot, repair workshops and goods sidings were located at Attiki station, next to Liossion street.

From downtown Athens to Kifissia station the line followed the alignment now used by the current Athens Metro Line 1. The downtown terminal (Lavrion Square) was situated a short distance from Omonoia square. The section from Lavrion Square to Attiki station currently runs underground (along Tritis Septemvriou, Rizou and Agorakritou streets) in a shallow cut-and-cover tunnel, but in the days of Attica Railways (until 1926) it ran at street level as a tramway.

From Kifissia the line was extended north to Strofyli.

The line was further extended as an industrial railway from Strofyli to the English Marble Company quarries at Dionyssos after 1900.

The line carried both passenger and freight traffic between Athens and Kifissia. The extension to Strofyli was used mainly by freight trains transporting blocks of marble.

Electric Transport Co. (1926–1938)
In 1926 the line was transferred to the Electric Transport Company (or ΗΕΜ), a member of the Power and Traction Finance Co. group. In 1929 the branch from Heraklion to Lavrion was taken over by the Piraeus, Athens and Peloponnese Railways (SPAP). After 1926 trains to Kifissia departed from Attiki station, and the section between Lavrion square and Attiki station was served by tram route K.

The Electric Transport Company operated the line until August 8, 1938, when it was closed pending electrification, but World War II stopped the work.

Aftermath
From 1928 to 1930 the Greek Electric Railways (or ΕΗΣ)), a company owned by the Power group, rebuilt the section between Omonoia and Attiki station in cut-and-cover tunnel. It reopened in 1949 as an extension of the Athens-Piraeus Electric Railway.

The line between Attica and Strofyli was transferred within the Power group in 1950, from ΗΕΜ to ΕΗΣ. This was done to continue the planned renovation and electrification which was interrupted by World War II. It reopened in stages to Nea Ionia in 1956, then to Kifissia in 1958. The remaining section from Kifissia to Strofyli was abandoned.

Rolling stock
Initially Attica Railways used nine Tubize 0-6-2T steam locomotives (1885). Later it acquired nine Krauss Z 2-6-0T, plus one of the same type constructed in Piraeus by Vassiliadis Works. After 1929 only the Tubize locomotives remained in use on the Kifissia line, as the Krauss locomotives were transferred to SPAP for the Lavrion branch.

See also

 ISAP
 Athens-Lavrion Railway
 Attica Railways

Notes and references

Further reading

 
 

Railway lines in Greece
Metre gauge railways in Greece
Rail transport in Attica